The Albula Railway Museum is located at the Bergün/Bravuogn railway station of the Albula Railway of the Swiss Rhaetian Railway. The museum is in operation since 2012.

The museum tells the history of the construction of the Albula Railway and shows many historical plans and artifacts. Topographic simulations and demonstrations of the tunneling methods are part of the multimedia displays.

One section of the museum houses a miniature Albula Railway operating in O scale built by Bernhard Tarnutzer that includes buildings, viaducts, and tunnels from the 1950s and 1960s.

The Rhaetian Railway Ge 6/6 I "crocodile" #407 has been placed at its entrance and can be used by visitors for a ride simulation.

References

External links

 Home page (in German)

Bergün Filisur
Museums in Graubünden
Railway museums in Switzerland
Rhaetian Railway